Harry Haffner (28 May 1900 – 14 October 1969) was a German lawyer and the last Judge-President of the Nazi People's Court.

Haffner was born in Uslar, Lower Saxony.  He graduated in law in 1926 and worked as a prosecutor. He joined the Nazi Party and SA on 1 May 1933.  Haffner was then Chief of Staff at the National Socialist Association of Legal Professionals and Zellenleiter of the NSV.  In 1934, he was appointed a prosecutor in Celle, and in 1936 he was appointed senior prosecutor to the Prosecutor General of Kassel.  In 1938, he was a representative of the General Prosecutor in Hamm.  On 1 January 1944, Haffner became the General Prosecutor of Katowice in occupied Poland where the Auschwitz concentration camp fell within his remit – he visited the camp on 28 June 1944.

On 12 March 1945, following the death of Roland Freisler in an air raid, he succeeded him as the last Judge-President of the Volksgerichtshof (People's Court).  He held this office until 24 April 1945 when the court finally ceased its activity only two weeks before the German surrender.

From 1946 he lived under the name of Heinrich Hartmann in the town of Sontra, where he ran a shop with his wife.  In 1953, he turned himself in to the authorities in Kassel and the prosecutor made his past public, but the investigations against him were dismissed.  He died in Hornberg, aged 69.

Sources

References

1900 births
1969 deaths
People from Uslar
Nazi Party politicians
Judges in the Nazi Party
Sturmabteilung personnel